The Movement for the Autonomy of Romagna (Movimento per l'Autonomia della Romagna, MAR) is a cultural movement active in Romagna, inspired by the political doctrines of regionalism and autonomism.

Romagna is an Italian historical region, currently without its own institutional autonomy: the movement requires the institution of Romagna Region.

The Movement promotes a decentrated distribution of public administrative power, as required by the Fundamental Principles (article 5) in the Constitution of Italian Republic that recognizes both territorial integrity of the Republic and local autonomies. Furthermore, the Movement seeks to protect the great cultural, linguistic, historical, political heritage of Romagna.

The MAR was founded in May 1990 by Stefano Servadei, a Socialist deputy, and Lorenzo Cappelli, a Christian Democratic senator. Currently the president of the Movement is the lawyer Riccardo Chiesa from Cesena, with Francesco Scaramuzzo from Cesenatico and Giovanni Poggiali from Ravenna as vice-presidents. Since 2008 Samuele Albonetti from Ravenna, as MAR's secretary, has been managing the Movement coordination, with Fabrizio Barnabè as vice-coordinator since 2020.

References

External links
Official website

1990 establishments in Italy
Political parties established in 1990
Political parties in Emilia-Romagna